Hürlimann Brewery is a former brewery in Zürich, Switzerland, now owned by the Rheinfelden, Aargau based brewery Feldschlösschen, which is owned by Carlsberg.

Hurlimann was founded in 1836 by Albert Hürlimann, and its management was in the same family for five generations. Hurlimann was one of the principal brewing companies of Switzerland (the other big ones being Calanda Bräu, Feldschlösschen and Cardinal Brewery).

The founder was a world leader in the scientific study of yeast, and the brewery had a long history of yeast development.

Ownership

Hürlimann was absorbed by Feldschlösschen in 1996. Feldschlösschen-Hürlimann-Gruppe was sold to Carlsberg in November 2000.
Hürlimann's Sternbrau is now brewed by Shepherd Neame to its original recipe.

Samichlaus
Hürlimann was famous for brewing the extremely potent beer Samichlaus ("Santa Claus") (250ml and 330ml bottles; 14% ABV). It was a Heller-Bock or Dunkel-Bock that was made every year on December 6 and then sold the following year. It was not brewed from 1996 to 2000 due to Feldschlösschen having no interest in doing so. The rights and recipe were sold by Carlsberg to Austrian brewer Schloss Eggenberger in 2000, who now manufacture it in 750ml bottles.

Retired Brands
Birell [275ml bottle; 0.8% ABV], 
Hürlimann Caesarus Imperator Heller Bock [330ml; 12.5% ABV]
Hürlimann Spezial Export Bier [355ml can, 5.2% ABV], 
Hürlimann Festbier [330ml; 5.2% ABV]
Hürlimann Five Star [330ml bottle; 5.2% ABV]
Hürlimann Gold Premium [330ml bottle;5.2% ABV]
Hürlimann Hammer [330ml bottle; 5% ABV] 
Hürlimann Hexenbrau ("Witch Beer") [330mml bottle; 5.4% ABV]
Hürlimann Panaché [500 ml can; 1.9% ABV (40% Lager Beer, 60% Lemonade)]
Hürlimann Sternbräu ("Star Beer") [500 ml Bottle, 500 ml can, or draft; 5.2% ABV].

Current Brands
Birell was manufactured for a while by Shepherd Neame, but was soon discontinued.

Coopers in Australia are brewing to Brauerei Hurlimanns original Birell formula for the ultra light under license from Carlsberg using Australian malted barley, hops and yeast. 

Hürlimann Sternbrau Lager: Export Bier [330 ml or 500 ml Bottle, 500 ml can, or draft keg; 4.8% ABV]. Shepherd Neame manufactures this beer in Britain and exports it to Europe.

References

Beer in Switzerland
Carlsberg Group
Manufacturing companies based in Zürich
Swiss brands